The R338 is a Regional Route in South Africa that connects Aberdeen with the R329 between Steytlerville and its origin at the R75.

Its northern origins is from the N9 at Aberdeen. It heads southeast to Klipplaat. At the town it intersects the R337 at a staggered junction. It leaves the town, and heads south-east to its southern origin at the R329.

External links
 Routes Travel Info

References

Regional Routes in the Eastern Cape